Brown Betty may refer to:

 Brown Betty (dessert), a dessert typically made with apples
 Brown Betty (horse), a British Thooughbred racehorse.
 Rudbeckia hirta, a flower commonly known as brown Betty
 Brown Betty (teapot)
 "Brown Betty" (Fringe), an episode of the television series Fringe